A conformal anomaly, scale anomaly, trace anomaly or Weyl anomaly  is an anomaly, i.e. a quantum phenomenon that breaks the conformal symmetry of the classical theory.

A classically conformal theory is a theory which, when placed on a surface with arbitrary background metric, has an action that is invariant under rescalings of the background metric (Weyl transformations), combined with corresponding transformations of the other fields in the theory. A conformal quantum theory is one whose partition function is unchanged by rescaling the metric. The variation of the action with respect to the background metric is proportional to the stress tensor, and therefore the variation with respect to a conformal rescaling is proportional to the trace of the stress tensor. As a result, the trace of the stress tensor must vanish for a conformally invariant theory. In the presence of a conformal anomaly the trace of the stress tensor can nevertheless acquire a non-vanishing expectation. For this reason, a conformal anomaly is sometimes also called a trace anomaly.

String theory

In string theory, conformal symmetry on the worldsheet is a local Weyl symmetry and the anomaly must therefore cancel if the theory is to be consistent. The required cancellation implies that the spacetime dimensionality must be equal to the critical dimension which is either 26 in the case of bosonic string theory or 10 in the case of superstring theory. This case is called critical string theory. There are alternative approaches known as non-critical string theory in which the space-time dimensions can be less than 26 for the bosonic theory or less than 10 for the superstring i.e. the four-dimensional case is plausible within this context. However, some intuitive postulates like flat space being a valid background, need to be given up.

QCD

In quantum chromodynamics in the chiral limit, the classical theory has no mass scale so there is a conformal symmetry. As a consequence, for example, the proton is massless because the quark's kinetic energy and potential energy cancel by the relativistic virial theorem.  However, in the quantum case the symmetry is broken by a conformal anomaly. This introduces a scale, which is the scale at which colour confinement occurs. This determines the sizes and masses of hadrons, except for pseudoscalar mesons. Hence this effect is responsible for most of the mass of ordinary matter. (In fact the quarks have non-zero masses, so the more realistic classical theory does have a mass scale. However, the masses are small so it is still nearly conformal. The mass due to the conformal anomaly is much greater than quark masses, so it has a much greater effect on the masses of hadrons.)

See also
 Anomaly (physics)
 Charge (physics)
 Central charge
 Anomalous scaling dimension
 Dimensional transmutation

References 

 Polchinski, Joseph (1998). String Theory, Cambridge University Press. A modern textbook.
 Vol. 1: An introduction to the bosonic string. .
 Vol. 2: Superstring theory and beyond. .
 
 
 
 
 
 

Anomalies (physics)
Conformal field theory
Quantum chromodynamics
Renormalization group
String theory